The 1915 Nobel Prize in Literature was awarded to the French author Romain Rolland (1866–1944) "as a tribute to the lofty idealism of his literary production and to the sympathy and love of truth with which he has described different types of human beings." The prize was awarded the following year on November 9, 1916 and he is the third Frenchman who became a Nobel recipient for the literature category.

Laureate

Rolland was a mystic and pacifist who studied spirituality, yoga, and Indian philosophy. He established the International Biogentic Society in 1929 to advance harmony, sustainability, and peace. Through communication, he spread the idea of the "oceanic feeling," which refers to the sensation of being at one with the universe, to people like Sigmund Freud and others. Regardless of genre, Rolland's literature centers on humanity's pursuit of pleasure, purpose, and the truth. Jean Christophe Krafft and Anette Rivière, the main protagonists in the novel series Jean-Christophe (1904–1912) and L'Ame enchantée ("The Enchanted Soul", 1922–1933) are in a struggle for both their physical and spiritual existence. In order to define the style of the collection of works, Rolland coined the term "roman-fleuve," which translates to "river-novel." He argued for the democratization of theater in his essay "The People's Theatre."

Deliberations

Nominations
Despite no author(s) being awarded for the 1915, the Swedish Academy received 26 nominations for 22 individuals among them Romain Rolland who was awarded the following year and was among the newly nominated. He only received three nominations before receiving the prize and nominated in 1936 the Austrian neurologist Sigmund Freud for the same category which led the academy's Nobel Committee to a great deal of discussion. Other newly nominated authors were British explorer Charles Montagu Doughty and German poet Ferdinand Avenarius. The Italian writer Grazia Deledda – the only female nominee – received the highest number of nominations.

The authors Mary Elizabeth Braddon, Thomas Alexander Browne, Saturnino Calleja, Luigi Capuana, Luigi Capuana, Gaston Arman de Caillavet, Remy de Gourmont, Francisco Giner de los Ríos, Tevfik Fikret, James Elroy Flecker, Justus Miles Forman, Elizabeth Boynton Harbert, Elbert Hubbard, Charles Klein, Aurelio Tolentino, Lucy Bethia Walford, Booker T. Washington, Ellen Gould White, and Julia Ditto Young died in 1915 without having been nominated for the prize.

References

External links
1915 Press release nobelprize.org

1915